The women's shot put at the 2022 World Athletics Indoor Championships took place on 18 March 2022.

Results
The final was started at 18:50.

References

Shot put
Shot put at the World Athletics Indoor Championships